Maurice Carlton (20 November 1913 – 7 May 1990) was a French athlete who specialized in the 100 meters. Carlton competed at the 1936 Summer Olympics.

References 

1913 births
1990 deaths
Guadeloupean male sprinters
French male sprinters
Olympic athletes of France
French people of Guadeloupean descent
Athletes (track and field) at the 1936 Summer Olympics
Chevaliers of the Légion d'honneur